Lygniodes is a genus of moths in the family Erebidae first described by Achille Guenée in 1852. The genus is restricted to the Asiatic tropics, east to Sulawesi and the Moluccas.

Description
Palpi with second joint reaching vertex of head, and third joint moderate length. Antennae simple. Thorax and abdomen smoothly scaled. Mid tibia spined and hind tibia slightly hairy. Forewings with arched costa, slightly produced and acute apex. Hindwings with very short cell. Vein 5 arise from near lower angle and vein 6 much curved.

Species
Lygniodes ciliata
Lygniodes endoleucus
Lygniodes hypoleuca
Lygniodes hypopyrrha Strand, 1913
Lygniodes morio Semper, 1900
Lygniodes ochrifera Felder, 1874
Lygniodes plateni
Lygniodes proutae Hulstaert, 1924
Lygniodes schoenbergi
Lygniodes vampyrus

Former species
Lygniodes maurus Butler, 1892

References

External links

 
Erebini
Moth genera